Prestolite Electric Incorporated is a global manufacturer and supplier of alternators, starters, electrical equipment, and services to the transportation, industrial, military, marine, agricultural and construction industries. The company sells its products to United States defense agencies, OEMs, and aftermarket suppliers under the Indiel, Leece-Neville, and Prestolite Electric brand names. The company operates production and engineering facilities in China, Europe and the United States. Prestolite Electric is privately owned by Broad Ocean Motors.

History

The Prestolite name
The following companies have been spun off under the Prestolite name and are no longer controlled by Prestolite Electric:
Prestolite (spark plugs) "Autolite" name sold in 1961 to the Ford Motor Company (who in turn is forced to sell it to Bendix by the early 1970s).
Prestolite Welding Equipment, formally Hobart Brothers of Troy, Ohio.
Prestolite Wire, division was sold in 1985.
Prestolite Battery sold to Exide in 1997.

The following Prestolite divisions were sold to Ametek in 2000:
Prestolite Motors (specialty direct current motors).
Prestolite Switch (instruments, switches & contactors).
Prestolite Power (power systems & battery chargers).

References

Auto parts suppliers of the United States
Motor vehicle battery manufacturers
Manufacturing companies based in Michigan
Companies based in Wayne County, Michigan
Electronics companies established in 1911
1911 establishments in Michigan